Nectandra impressa is a species of plant in the family Lauraceae. It is endemic to Brazil.

References

impressa
Endemic flora of Brazil
Data deficient plants
Least concern biota of South America
Taxonomy articles created by Polbot